Tropicibacter naphthalenivorans is a Gram-negative, aerobic and motile bacterium from the genus of Tropicibacter which has been isolated from seawater from the Semarang Port in Indonesia.

References 

Rhodobacteraceae
Bacteria described in 2009